"Never Say Never" is a song by American country music singers Cole Swindell and Lainey Wilson. It was released on November 19, 2021, as the second single from Swindell's fourth studio album Stereotype. Swindell co-wrote the song with Jessi Alexander and Chase McGill, and it was produced by Zach Crowell. It peaked at number one on the Billboard Country Airplay chart in April 2022, becoming Swindell's seventh number one single, and Wilson's second.

Background and content
On November 18, 2021, Swindell and Wilson announced the collaboration on social media, "Never Say Never" is the first duet between the two artists. Swindell stated in a press release: "I wrote 'Never Say Never' with Jessi Alexander and Chase McGill in 2018 about a relationship you just can't stay away from, I have been a fan of Lainey Wilson's for a while now and what she brings to this song is everything it needed". Wilson said: "'Things a Man Oughta Know' was such an incredible ride, I can’t wait to get this next song out into the world and see where it leads".

Composition
Billy Dukes of Taste of Country wrote that the producer Zach Crowell "adds a swirl of emotions with steel guitar, keys and a thundering rhythm section" that contrasts Swindell's previous work.

Critical reception
Music and Tour News commented that Wilson's presence "give[s] the stellar song an added dimension" and the two artists "sound absolutely fantastic together on the smash-hit".

Music video
The music video was released on January 12, 2022, and directed by FlyHi Films’ Michael Monaco. The video was filmed in Brushy Mountain State Penitentiary located at the suburb of Knoxville, Tennessee. It tells a story about "a forbidden relationship between a prison guard with an inmate".

Charts

Weekly charts

Year-end charts

Certifications

Release history

References

2021 singles
2021 songs
Cole Swindell songs
Lainey Wilson songs
Songs written by Jessi Alexander
Songs written by Chase McGill
Songs written by Cole Swindell
Warner Records Nashville singles
Male–female vocal duets